Edson Furatidzayi Chisingaitwi Sithole (5 June 1935 - 15 October 1975) was the second black African to be admitted to the Rhodesian Bar in 1963 after Herbert Chitepo. He received his LLB from the University of London through correspondence.  Subsequently, he was the first black person in the entire southern and central African region to obtain a Doctor of Laws (LLD) degree from the University of South Africa (UNISA) in 1974. In October 1975 he was kidnapped together with his secretary Miriam Mhlanga by suspected members of the Rhodesian Special Branch and they were never seen alive again to this day.

References 

1935 births
1975 deaths